The Association of Black Sociologists (ABS) is an American learned society dedicated to the advancement of scholarship by African American sociologists. It is based in Chicago, Illinois. Its official journal is Issues in Race & Society, which it publishes in a partnership with Vanderbilt University's Peabody College.

History
The history of the Association of Black Sociologists began in 1968, when a group of American sociologists met to encourage the American Sociological Association (ASA) to increase the participation of black Americans in their ranks. It was established in 1970 as the Caucus of Black Sociologists (CBS) at that year's ASA meeting in Washington, D.C. The CBS was influenced by both the women's liberation movement and opposition to the Vietnam War. In 1976, the CBS was incorporated as an independent organization, the Association of Black Sociologists. As a result, it ceased to be a caucus of the ASA.

Membership 
When it was founded in 1970, the ABS (then known as the CBS) had 76 members, a number which had grown to 88 by 1979.

References

External links

Sociological organizations
1970 establishments in Washington, D.C.
Organizations established in 1970
African-American professional organizations
Professional associations based in Chicago